"Fuego" (Spanish for "fire") is a song by The Cheetah Girls and is the second single from their second studio album, TCG. On their official MySpace profile, the girls described the song as a "Latin party anthem" with a sample of Lionel Richie's '80's hit single "All Night Long (All Night)". The song was released on September 15, 2007 on Radio Disney and was later released through digital distribution on October 10. It peaked at #27 on Billboard's Hot Dance Club Play chart.

Promotion
In 2007, as promotion for the single and for the album, the Girls performed "Fuego" on Good Morning America on October 12, and on The Early Show on October 13. The song was also featured on the set list for their One World Tour.

Music video
The music video was directed by Marcus Raboy on October 21, 2007 and it premiered on Disney Channel on November 22. It received heavy rotation on Disney Channel and MTV 3. There is a Spanish version of the video in which there are new scenes and different sequences.

The video revolves around the three girls dancing with a crowd of people at a party. Throughout the video are scenes of the girls dancing while other people are performing a dance routine in front of a red-orange background.

Track listing 
iTunes Single
 "Fuego" - 3:09
 "Fuego" (Spanish Version) - 3:27
Remix EP
 "Fuego" (Cabana Remix)
 "Fuego" (Ranny Radio Edit)
 "Fuego" (English Club Mix)
 "Fuego" (Party Mix)
 "Fuego" (Party Dub)
 "Fuego" (Spanish Club)

Chart performance
The song debuted and peaked at #27 on the Billboard's Hot Dance Club Play during the week of February 28, 2008. It did not enter the Billboard Hot 100, but it did reach #22 on the Bubbling Under Hot 100 Singles.

Charts

Release history

References

External links
 Official Cheetah Girls website

2007 singles
The Cheetah Girls songs
Dance-pop songs
Music videos directed by Marcus Raboy
Song recordings produced by J. R. Rotem
Songs written by J. R. Rotem
Songs written by The-Dream
2007 songs
Hollywood Records singles